Plan International is a development and humanitarian organisation which works in over 75 countries across Africa, the Americas, and Asia to advance children’s rights and equality for girls. Its focus is on child protection, education, child participation, economic security, emergencies, health, sexual and reproductive health and rights, and water and sanitation. As of 2021, Plan International reached 26.2 million girls and 24.1 million boys through its programming.

Plan International provides training in disaster preparedness, response and recovery, and has worked on relief efforts in countries including Haiti, Colombia and Japan.

History 

Plan International was founded in 1937 during the Spanish Civil War by British journalist John Langdon-Davies and aid worker Eric Muggeridge. The organization was founded with the aim to provide food, accommodation and education to children whose lives had been disrupted by the Spanish Civil War.

Timeline
1930s – Plan International was founded as "Foster Parents Plan for Children in Spain."
1940s – During World War II, the organization became known as "Foster Parents Plan for War Children" and worked in England, helping displaced children from all over Europe. After the war, Plan International extended aid to children in France, Belgium, Italy, the Netherlands, Germany, Greece and briefly in Poland, Czechoslovakia and China.
1950s – As Europe recovered, Plan International gradually moved out of these countries and opened new programs in less developed countries. It became "Foster Parents Plan Inc." to reflect the goal of bringing lasting change to the lives of children in need, whatever their circumstances.
1960s – Foster Parents Plan expanded its work to countries in South America and Asia. In 1962, U.S. First Lady Jacqueline Kennedy was honorary chairwoman during Plan's Silver Jubilee.
1970s – In 1974, the global name became Plan International as programs now spanned South America, Asia and Africa.
1980s – Belgium, Germany, Japan and the UK joined Canada, the US, Australia and the Netherlands as donor countries. Plan International was recognised by the United Nations Economic and Social Council.
1990s – Plan International offices opened in France, Norway, Finland, Denmark, Sweden and the Republic of Korea.
2000s – The name Plan International evolved and a unified global identity was created to help make the organization more easily recognized around the world, and the logo was updated.
2017 – Plan International launched a new "International Global Strategy 2017–2022", which places an added emphasis on working with girls. The traditional blue logo was updated.

Funding and accountability 

Plan International's income comes from supporters who sponsor children and the remainder is raised through donations and grants. An average of 80% of this money goes directly to supporting Plan International’s development and humanitarian work. The remainder is spent on fundraising initiatives and maintaining an international network of support staff. Plan International publishes annual reports detailing its fundraising and spending activity.

The organization receives funding to implement grants from a range of multilateral institutions, such as the UK's Department for International Development (DFID), Australian Department of Foreign Affairs and Trade (DFAT), the Swedish International Development Cooperation Agency (SIDA), United States Agency for International Development (USAID), and other multilateral agencies.

Plan International adheres to several international standards and quality assurance mechanisms including the International Non-Governmental Organisations (INGO) Commitment to Accountability Charter and the Code of Conduct for the International Red Cross and Red Crescent Movement and NGOs in Disaster Relief.

Notable persons associated 
Notable people endorsers associated with Plan International include Jacqueline Kennedy, David Elliot, Beau Bridges, Dina Eastwood, Scott Bakula, and Nicholas D. Kristof, also a child sponsor. In 2015 Mo'ne Davis teamed up with the brand M4D3 (Make A Difference Everyday) to design a line of sneakers for girls, with some of the proceeds going toward the Plan International’s Because I Am a Girl campaign. Suman Pokhrel worked for Plan International Nepal as an employee joining the organization in 1998.

Anil Kapoor, who starred in Danny Boyle's film Slumdog Millionaire, is an ambassador for Plan India. He donated his entire fee for the movie to the NGO's Universal Birth Registration campaign. Slumdog Millionaire stars Dev Patel and Freida Pinto were among cast members who attended a screening of the film at Somerset House in London, where over £2,000 was raised for Plan’s work in Mumbai, the setting of the film. 

The organization was featured in the 2002 film About Schmidt.

Holly Aboud (BSC, ACA), a well known child actor as seen in the Sunday times and prominent business ambassador, is running in the London Marathon in aid of Plan International.

See also 
Convention on the Rights of the Child
International Day of the Girl Child
Odisha State Child Protection Society
National branches:
Plan UK
Plan Canada
Plan USA

References

External links 

 

Children's charities based in England
Charities based in Surrey
International charities
Organizations established in 1937
Children's rights organizations